The French Provisional Government or French Executive Commission of 1815 replaced the French government of the Hundred Days that had been formed by Napoleon after his return from exile on Elba.
It was formed on 22 June 1815 after the abdication of Napoleon following his defeat at the Battle of Waterloo. 

The government acted under the nominal authority of Napoleon II, who had technically succeeded his father as Emperor after the abdication; however, this was a mere formality, since Napoleon II was a four-year-old child and was in Austria with his mother Marie Louise, and thus unable to actually exercise his powers.

Following the second Bourbon Restoration, on 9 July 1815 the Provisional Government was replaced by the Ministry of Charles-Maurice de Talleyrand-Périgord.

Formation

On 12 June 1815 Napoleon left Paris for modern day Belgium, where the two Coalition armies, an allied one commanded by the Duke of Wellington and a Prussian one under Prince Blücher were assembling. Napoleon was defeated at the Battle of Waterloo on 18 June 1815. He returned to Paris and abdicated for the second time on 22 June 1815. That day the two chambers nominated the members of the Provisional Government, that would serve as government until the second Bourbon Restoration.

Members

The members of the commission named on 22 June 1815 were:
 Joseph Fouché (President)
 Lazare Carnot
 Paul Grenier
 Armand Augustin Louis de Caulaincourt
 Nicolas Marie Quinette

Ministers

On 23 June 1815 new provisional commissioners were named to head four of the ministries:
 Foreign Affairs: Louis Pierre Édouard, Baron Bignon
 Interior: Claude-Marie Carnot
 Police: Joseph Pelet de la Lozère
 Justice: Antoine Boulay de la Meurthe

The other commissioners retained their positions.
They were:
 Finance: Martin-Michel-Charles Gaudin
 Treasury: Nicolas François, Count Mollien
 Navy and Colonies: Denis Decrès
 War: Louis-Nicolas Davout

Events

On 23 June 1815 Napoleon II was declared Emperor.
The two Coalition armies under Prince Blücher and Duke of Wellington and advanced from the north and surrounded Paris.
On 3 July 1815 the commissioners surrendered Paris under the terms of the Convention of St. Cloud.
With the capital and departments occupied by Seventh Coalition troops, the Executive Commission was unable to function and resigned on 7 July 1815.
The ministry of Charles-Maurice de Talleyrand-Périgord took office on 9 July 1815.

Notes

References
 

 

French governments
1815 establishments in France
1815 disestablishments in France
Cabinets established in 1815
Cabinets disestablished in 1815
Hundred Days
Provisional governments